is a 2013 Japanese film directed by Hiroshi Ishikawa.

Synopsis

The film concerns a trip taken by two women, Jinko (Aoi Miyazaki) and Motoko (Sakura Ando), and their driver, Haraki (Shiori Kutsuna), to see Miki (Kazue Fukiishi), an old friend now living in a psychiatric hospital after attempting suicide. Jinko and Motoko have not seen Miki in six years, and the trip becomes a meditation on their own lives and sorrows, as well as reconciliation for their guilt of not being able to help her before.

Cast
Aoi Miyazaki as Jinko
Shiori Kutsuna as Haraki
Sakura Ando as Motoko
Kazue Fukiishi as Miki
Masanobu Andō as Naoto
Shunsuke Kazama as Kawada
Mariko Gotō as Senpai
Hanae Kan as Kyoko

Reception
On Film Business Asia, Derek Elley gave the film a 4 out of 10, saying that the "existential road drama of four young women offers diminishing results." A review on Japan Times by Mark Schilling gave the film a rating of 3.5 out of 5.

References

External links
 
 

2013 films
Films directed by Hiroshi Ishikawa
2010s Japanese films